English actor Timothy Spall OBE (born 27 February 1957) has made over 100 appearances in film and television. Having made his cinematic debut in the 1979 film Quadrophenia, Spall first rose to fame for playing boring Barry Spencer Taylor in the comedy  drama Auf Wiedersehen, Pet (1983–2004), a role that won him popularity and critical praise. He has gone on to become an acclaimed Hollywood actor featuring in a vast number of cinematic roles, among them the starring role of Maurice Purley in Secrets & Lies (1996), for which he received nominations for a BAFTA Award for Best Actor in a Leading Role and a London Film Critics Circle Award for Actor of the Year.

Film

Television

Video games

References 

Male actor filmographies
British filmographies